Speed, first published in 1970, was the first of three published works by William S. Burroughs, Jr., the son of the Beat Generation author William S. Burroughs.

Summary
Speed is an autobiographical novel about the ins and outs of the life of a methamphetamine addict. It starts out with Burroughs in his grandmother's house in Florida and moves to the streets of New York. It is written in the straight narrative style.  Throughout the book the life of the speed addict is explored and the stories of how Burroughs got from being a teenage speed-freak to getting arrested and tried for forging a prescription is touched upon. Speed was almost rejected by its publisher due to its crude themes, such as the in-depth sex scene between Burroughs and his child love, Maria.

Impact
Burroughs' second work, Kentucky Ham, is similar in some aspects to Speed and elucidates on the other adventures had by him after Speed was written. His third work, Cursed From Birth, was compiled by David Ohle and published posthumously.

Due to the author having an almost identical name to his more famous father, and because the book deals with themes often featured in his father's writings, Speed is often erroneously credited to the elder Burroughs.

References

American autobiographical novels
1970 American novels
Novels by William S. Burroughs Jr.
Olympia Press books